Michael Beattie is a Canadian-American actor. He has played voice roles in several Illumination studio animated films, starting with The Lorax in 2012.

Filmography

Film
 Care Bears Nutcracker Suite - The Nutcracker (voice)
 Swept Away - Todd
 The Bet - Detective
 Cats & Dogs: The Revenge of Kitty Galore - Angus MacDougall (voice)
 The Lorax - 2nd Marketing Guy (voice)
 Minions - VNC Announcer, Walter Jr. (voice)
 The Secret Life of Pets -  Tattoo (voice)
 Despicable Me 3 - TV Show Host / Scar-Faced Man (voice)
 The Grinch - Store Clerk (voice)
 The Secret Life of Pets 2 - Lead Wolf / Skinny Cat (voice)
 Minions: The Rise of Gru - VNC Announcer (voice)

Television
 Countdown to Looking Glass - Youth #1 (Television film)
 The Edison Twins - Russell (Episode: "One Way Ticket")
 Beverly Hills Teens - Buck Huckster, Wilshire Brentwood (voice) (Episode: "Dream Date")
 The Care Bears - (voice)
 Friday the 13th: The Series - Photographer (Episode: "Eye of Death")
 Babar - Additional voices
 The Adventures of T-Rex - Buck, Chief Delaney (voice)
 Conan the Adventurer - Greywolf, Needle (voice)
 Murder One - Swaboda (Episode: "Chapter Nine, Year Two")
 Brooklyn South - 1st Photographer (Episode: "Exposing Johnson")
 As Told by Ginger - Principal Erickson, Cameraman (voice)

Videogames
 Spider-Man - Shocker
 The Hobbit - Bilbo Baggins (Credited as Michael Beatie) 
 Pitfall: The Lost Expedition - Leech, Pusca, Explorer 
 Spider-Man 2 - Shocker 
 World of Warcraft - Additional voices
 Titan Quest - Additional voices
 Saints Row - Stilwater's Resident
 Company of Heroes - Additional voices
 The Sopranos: Road to Respect - Additional voices 
 Saints Row 2 - Additional voices
 Dragon Age: Origins - Additional voices 
 Mass Effect 2 - Mordin Solus
 Star Wars: The Old Republic - Various
 World of Warcraft: Mists of Pandaria - Additional voices
 Metal Gear Rising: Revengeance - Blade Wolf / LQ-84i 
 Marvel Heroes - Northstar
 Despicable Me: Minion Rush - Villaintriloquist and Puppet
Mad Max - The Outcrier

References

External links
 

Living people
20th-century Canadian male actors
21st-century Canadian male actors
Canadian expatriates in the United States
Canadian male film actors
Canadian male television actors
Canadian male voice actors
Year of birth missing (living people)